"Bebe" (stylized in all caps) is a single by American rapper 6ix9ine featuring Puerto Rican rapper Anuel AA. It was released on August 31, 2018, through TenThousand Projects.

Production
"Bebe" has a tempo of 102 beats per minute. It marks the first time 6ix9ine, whose mother is Mexican and father is Puerto Rican, releases a song in Spanish.

Music video
The song's accompanying music video was released on August 31, 2018. The music video was filmed in Miami Beach and Four Seasons Hotel Miami. It has received over 1.3 billion views on YouTube. In the video, the flags of Mexico and Puerto Rico can be seen, referencing 6ix9ine and Anuel AA's nationalities.

Charts

Weekly charts

Year-end charts

Certifications

References

Anuel AA songs
2018 singles
2018 songs
Songs written by 6ix9ine
Songs written by Ronny J
Songs written by Anuel AA
Song recordings produced by Ronny J